Dorvitsa (also Δορβιτσιά - Dorvitsia) is a village in Aetolia-Acarnania, Greece. It is part of the municipal unit Pyllini.

References

External links
Dorvitsa village club

Populated places in Aetolia-Acarnania